The canton of L'Albret is an administrative division of the Lot-et-Garonne department, southwestern France. It was created at the French canton reorganisation which came into effect in March 2015. Its seat is in Nérac.

It consists of the following communes:
 
Andiran
Calignac
Espiens
Fieux
Francescas
Fréchou
Lamontjoie
Lannes
Lasserre
Mézin
Moncaut
Moncrabeau
Montagnac-sur-Auvignon
Nérac
Nomdieu
Poudenas
Réaup-Lisse
Sainte-Maure-de-Peyriac
Saint-Pé-Saint-Simon
Saint-Vincent-de-Lamontjoie
Saumont
Sos

References

Cantons of Lot-et-Garonne